Matías Germán Melluso (born 9 June 1998) is an Argentine professional footballer who plays as a defender for Gimnasia y Esgrima.

Career
Melluso got his senior career started with Gimnasia y Esgrima in 2018. He was moved into the first-team by manager Facundo Sava during 2017–18, appearing on the substitutes bench on seven occasions prior to making his professional debut on 21 April during a defeat away to Talleres. Further appearances against Boca Juniors, Independiente and Newell's Old Boys followed as Gimnasia y Esgrima finished 23rd.

Career statistics
.

References

External links

1998 births
Living people
Footballers from La Plata
Argentine people of Italian descent
Argentine footballers
Association football defenders
Argentine Primera División players
Club de Gimnasia y Esgrima La Plata footballers